Maurice Clarke may refer to:

 Maurice Clarke (cricketer) (born 1981), Jamaican cricketer
 Maurice Clarke (priest), Anglican archdeacon in India
 Maurice Gordon Clarke (1877–?), American football and baseball player and coach